Macarthuriaceae is a family of plants in the order Caryophyllales and consists of a single genus, Macarthuria.

Description
Macarthuriaceae are rigid or wiry, rush-like herbs or subshrubs with green stems and reduced leaves. The small flowers have five perianth members, sometimes also five "petals", and eight stamens fused at the base.

Taxonomy
In 2009, Macarthuria was placed with Limeum in the Limeaceae, based on its morphology, but at that time no molecular material of Macarthuria had been examined. Prior to this, Endress and Bittrich had placed it in the family Molluginaceae. However, in 2011, molecular evidence was published, showing that Macarthuria is sister to all core Caryophyllales. Thus, Macarthuria needed to be placed in a family of its own, Macarthuriaceae.

References

 
Caryophyllales families
Monogeneric plant families
Taxa named by Maarten J. M. Christenhusz